The 2018–19 Tigres UANL season was the 51st season in the football club's history and the 21st consecutive season in the top flight of Mexican football.

Coaching staff

Players

Squad information

Players and squad numbers last updated on 2 December 2018.Note: Flags indicate national team as has been defined under FIFA eligibility rules. Players may hold more than one non-FIFA nationality.

Transfers

In

Out

Competitions

Overview

Torneo Apertura

League table

Results summary

Result round by round

Matches

Liguilla

Quarter-finals

Apertura Copa MX

Group stage

Knockout phase

Round of 16

Quarterfinals

Torneo Clausura

League table

Results summary

Result round by round

Matches

CONCACAF Champions League

Round of 16

Quarter-finals

Semi-finals

Statistics

Goals

Hat-tricks

Clean sheets

References

External links

Mexican football clubs 2018–19 season
Tigres UANL seasons
Tigres